Arenaria funiculata is a species of plant in the family Caryophyllaceae. It is endemic to Spain.  Its natural habitat is rocky areas. It is threatened by habitat loss.

In 2007, Simone Fior and Per Ola Kampis proposed the transfer of Moehringia fontqueri from the genus Moehringia to the genus Arenaria, renaming the species Arenaria funiculata.

References

External links
Moehringia fontqueri, Joyas botánicas de Almería

Flora of Spain
funiculata
Endangered plants
Taxonomy articles created by Polbot
Taxobox binomials not recognized by IUCN